José Alves dos Santos, nicknamed Zague (10 August 1934 – 19 January 2021) was a Brazilian footballer. Among the teams he played for were Corinthians in his home country, and Club América in Mexico.

Club career
Zague was only one of several high-profile signings made in the early years of Emilio Azcárraga Milmo's ownership of Club América. Azcárraga, the owner of the Mexican television network Televisa, purchased both Zague and Francisco Moacyr, another Brazilian, prior to the 1961-1962 season.

As a striker, Zague would rarely leave the opposing penalty box or run towards the ball, instead preferring to let other players pass to him so he could shoot from a comfortable distance. For these reasons, he was known as "The Lone Wolf" by media and fans alike.

Alves scored 102 goals for Club América, of which 86 were made for the Aguilas during league competitions. He also won the Golden Boot after the 1965-66 season, in which he scored 20 goals.

Personal life
Zague was born in Bahia, Brazil. He was the father of Luís Roberto Alves, nicknamed Zaguinho and Zague, who would also go on to play for Club América and for the Selección de fútbol de México (Mexico national team) because Luis Roberto was born in Mexico, during his father's playing days for América.

Honours 
América
Primera División: 1965–66
Copa México: 1963–64, 1964–65

Individual
Primera División Top Goal Scorer: 1965–66

References

External links
 Club América player profile

1934 births
2021 deaths
Brazilian footballers
Brazilian expatriate footballers
Club América footballers
Santos FC players
Liga MX players
Expatriate footballers in Mexico
Association football forwards
Sportspeople from Salvador, Bahia